The 1920 Rhode Island Rams football team was an American football team that represented Rhode Island State College (later renamed the University of Rhode Island) as an independent during the 1920 college football season. The team compiled a 0–4–4 record.

Prior to the 1920 season, Rhode Island State hired Frank Keaney as the coach of its athletic teams. Keaney served as Rhode Island State's head football coach through the 1940 season. He was the basketball and baseball coach through the 1948 season. In 1960, he was inducted into the Basketball Hall of Fame.

Schedule

References

Rhode Island State
Rhode Island Rams football seasons
College football winless seasons
Rhode Island State Rams football